Sávio Alves Marchiote, commonly known as Sávio,  is a Brazilian footballer who plays as a right-back.

Career
Sávio started his career with Monte Azul in the third division of Campeonato Paulista and was signed by Ponte Preta in May 2017 to play in the youth sector, being named as a senior squad substitute for the last game of the 2017 Campeonato Brasileiro Série A season. In 2018 he had a short spell with Rio Preto and then moved to Votuporanguense where he played in 21 of the 22 games of the clubs winning 2018 Copa Paulista campaign. In January 2019 he signed for Coritiba.

Sávio made his national league debut in the 2019 Campeonato Brasileiro Série B as a first half substitute in the 3–2 win over Paraná Clube on 8 June 2019.

References

External links
 

Living people
1996 births
Brazilian footballers
Association football defenders
Atlético Monte Azul players
Associação Atlética Ponte Preta players
Rio Preto Esporte Clube players
Clube Atlético Votuporanguense players
Coritiba Foot Ball Club players
Campeonato Brasileiro Série B players